Derek Spalding (born 20 December 1954 in Dundee, Scotland) is a former soccer player, who played as a defender. Spalding played for Hibernian in the Scottish Football League until he emigrated to the United States in 1977. He then played seven seasons in the North American Soccer League and at least two in the Major Indoor Soccer League. He also earned one cap with the US national team, in 1982.

Professional
Growing up in Scotland, Spalding signed with First Division club Hibernian as a youth player. He worked his way through the reserves before gaining a spot on the first team in 1972. Spalding played for Hibs in the 1974 Scottish League Cup Final, which Hibs lost 6–3 to Celtic.

He played with Hibs until he left Scotland to move to the United States. Spalding had married an American woman and therefore qualified for a green card. When he signed with the Chicago Sting of the North American Soccer League (NASL) in 1978, he counted as one of the team's American players. He played five seasons in Chicago, winning the 1981 NASL championship with the Sting. In 1983, he signed with the Toronto Blizzard and spent two seasons in Canada. In both 1983 and 1984, Spalding and his teammates went to the NASL championship, only to lose to the Tulsa Roughnecks in 1983 and the Sting in 1984.

Both the Blizzard and the NASL folded at the end of the 1984 season. With the collapse of the NASL, the Sting jumped to the Major Indoor Soccer League and Spalding signed with the Sting on 22 November 1984. Spalding underwent ankle surgery following a game injury in 1986. He lost the rest of the season, then was cut by the Sting and denied workers compensation benefits. This led Spalding to join Rudy Glenn, who had also suffered a career-ending injury, in a suit against the Sting in September 1986.

National team
Spalding earned one cap with the US national team in a 2–1 win over Trinidad and Tobago on 21 March 1982.

Coaching and team management
Spalding served as an assistant coach with the Chicago Power of the National Professional Soccer League. During the 1989–1990 season, head coach Karl-Heinz Granitza was fired and Spalding served as head coach for the remainder of the season. He was fired at the end of the season, to be replaced by Pato Margetic.

In 1995, became the director of the Chicago Stingers of the USISL.

Spalding coaches the Libertyville High School boys' junior varsity soccer team.

See also
List of United States men's international soccer players born outside the United States

References

External links
 National Soccer Hall of Fame profile
 NASL/MISL stats

1954 births
Living people
Footballers from Dundee
American expatriate sportspeople in Canada
American expatriate soccer players
American soccer coaches
American soccer players
Chicago Sting (MISL) players
Chicago Sting (NASL) players
Expatriate soccer players in Canada
Expatriate soccer players in the United States
Association football defenders
Hibernian F.C. players
Major Indoor Soccer League (1978–1992) players
National Professional Soccer League (1984–2001) coaches
North American Soccer League (1968–1984) indoor players
North American Soccer League (1968–1984) players
Scottish expatriate footballers
Scottish Football League players
Scottish football managers
Scottish expatriate football managers
Scottish footballers
Scottish emigrants to the United States
Toronto Blizzard (1971–1984) players
United States men's international soccer players
Scottish expatriate sportspeople in the United States
Scottish expatriate sportspeople in Canada